Marshal-Admiral Count   (20 May 1843 – 16 January 1914) was a Japanese career officer and admiral in the Imperial Japanese Navy in Meiji-period Japan.

Biography
Born in what is now part of Kagoshima City as the son of a samurai of the Satsuma Domain, Itō studied naval engineering and gunnery at the Kobe Naval Training Center together with Sakamoto Ryōma and Mutsu Munemitsu. He participated in the Anglo-Satsuma War as a member of the Satsuma domain's navy. Before the Boshin War, Itoh had already relocated to Edo and had placed his naval skills at the service of the forces striving to overthrow the Tokugawa Shogunate. He escaped from the burning of the Satsuma Domain residence in Edo and subsequently fought in many of the naval engagements of the Boshin War.

After the Meiji Restoration, Itō was commissioned as a lieutenant and served on the corvette Nisshin  in the fledgling Imperial Japanese Navy, commanding the Nisshin from 1877. Promoted to captain in 1882, he served on many warships of the Imperial Japanese Navy in its pioneer days, notably the Ryūjō, Fusō, and Hiei. In 1885, he was placed in charge of the Yokosuka Naval Arsenal. The same year, he travelled to the United Kingdom, and brought the Naniwa back to Japan.

On 15 June 1886, he was promoted to rear admiral, and made commandant of the Imperial Japanese Navy Academy. He was promoted to vice admiral on 12 December 1892 and made commandant of the Yokosuka Naval District. On 20 May 1893, he became commander-in-chief of the Readiness Fleet.

With the start of the First Sino-Japanese War in 1894, he became the first Commander-in-Chief of the Combined Fleet and won several naval battles against the Chinese Empire's Beiyang Fleet led by Admiral Ding Ruchang, notably at the Battle of the Yellow Sea.

On 11 May 1895, Itō became Chief of the Imperial Japanese Navy General Staff. In 1898, and was ennobled with the title of shishaku (viscount) on 5 August 1898 under the kazoku peerage system.  He was promoted to full admiral on 28 September 1898.

During the Russo-Japanese War he continued to serve as head of the Navy General Staff . After the war, he became marshal admiral on 31 January 1905, and his title of nobility was raised to that of hakushaku (count) in 1907. At the same time, he was awarded the Order of the Golden Kite (1st class) and the Grand Cordon of the Supreme Order of the Chrysanthemum.

Itō professed to have absolutely no interest in politics whatsoever, but was unofficially regarded as one of the genrō by his contemporaries.

Itō died in 1914. His grave is at the temple of Kaian-ji in Shinagawa, Tokyo.

References

Books

External links

Notes

1843 births
1914 deaths
People from Kagoshima
People from Satsuma Domain
Samurai
People of Meiji-period Japan
Imperial Japanese Navy marshal admirals
People of the Boshin War
Japanese military personnel of the First Sino-Japanese War
Japanese military personnel of the Russo-Japanese War
Kazoku
Shimazu retainers
Recipients of the Order of the Golden Kite
Recipients of the Order of the Plum Blossom